Natalie M. Higgins (born July 24, 1988) is an American politician serving in the Massachusetts House of Representatives. She is a member of the Democratic Party.  Natalie is a lifelong Leominster resident, Boston-educated attorney, and former non-profit director and rape crisis counselor.

She is a graduate of Leominster High School, UMass Amherst and the Northeastern University School of Law. As an undergraduate at UMass Amherst, she interned for Jennifer Flanagan, at the time a state representative. She was admitted to the Massachusetts Bar in 2014. She identifies as openly LGBT.

Political career
Natalie Higgins was elected to the Massachusetts House of Representatives in November 2016 and sworn in as State Representative for the 4th Worcester District (Leominster) on January 4, 2017, and reelected in 2018, and 2020.
In the 2019 - 2020 Legislative session, Higgins is the Vice-Chair of the House Committee on Personnel & Administration.

Leadership and Committees 

  Vice-Chair, Joint Committee on Public Service
 House Committee on Ways and Means
 Joint Committee on Children, Families, and Persons with Disabilities
 Joint Committee on Mental Health, Substance Use, and Recovery
 Joint Committee on Ways and Means

See also
 2017–2018 Massachusetts legislature
 2019–2020 Massachusetts legislature
 2021–2022 Massachusetts legislature
 2020 Massachusetts House of Representatives election

References

External links
 Legislative website
 Constituent services website
 Campaign website

Living people
Democratic Party members of the Massachusetts House of Representatives
Politicians from Worcester, Massachusetts
21st-century American women politicians
LGBT state legislators in Massachusetts
University of Massachusetts Amherst alumni
Northeastern University School of Law alumni
1988 births
Women state legislators in Massachusetts